The Geyserville Union School on Main St. in Geyserville, California was built in 1921.  It was a work of Henry C. Smith.  It was listed on the National Register of Historic Places in 1979.

History

Geyserville Union School stemmed out of Geyserville High School, which in 1881, taught students in a shed on Geyserville Avenue. Students were then moved to the Union School. Middle and high schoolers moved to newer schools in the area by 1972, leaving only elementary school attendees at Union. The school mascot was the mustang horse.

References

Mission Revival architecture in California
School buildings completed in 1921
Schools in Sonoma County, California
National Register of Historic Places in Sonoma County, California
School buildings on the National Register of Historic Places in California
1921 establishments in California